2015 in Ghana lists events of note that happened in the Ghana in the year 2015.

Incumbents
 President: John Dramani Mahama
 Vice President: Kwesi Amissah-Arthur
 Chief Justice: Georgina Wood

Events

January

February

March

April

May

June
 June 3–11 people are killed in a fire at a filling station in Accra.
 June 4 - An explosion happens in Accra, killing 78 people.
 June 5 - The death toll of yesterday's explosion increases to over 200.

July
 July 7 - Talensi by-election - Following Robert Nachinab Doameng (NPP) becoming the Paramount Chief of Tongo, a by-election was held resulting in Benson Tongo Baba of the NDC being elected MP for Talensi with a margin of 3521.

August

September

October

November

December

Deaths
19 April - Theodosia Okoh, 92, flag designer and sports administrator
12 May - Cecil Jones Attuquayefio, 70, football player and coach
2 September - Charles Gyamfi, 85, football player (Fortuna Düsseldorf) and coach (national team)

National holidays
Holidays in italics are "special days", while those in regular type are "regular holidays".
 January 1: New Year's Day
 March 6: Independence Day
 April 22 Good Friday
 May 1: Labor Day
 December 4: Farmers day
 December 25: Christmas
 December 26: Boxing day

In addition, several other places observe local holidays, such as the foundation of their town. These are also "special days."

References

 
2010s in Ghana
Years of the 21st century in Ghana
Ghana
Ghana